Laxon is a surname. Notable people with the surname include:

Herbert Laxon (1881–1965), English rugby union player
Sheila Laxon, Welsh horse trainer

See also
LaVon (given name)